XEBCC-AM/XHBCC-FM is an AM-FM combo radio station in Ciudad del Carmen, Campeche, broadcasting on 1030 kHz (a United States clear-channel frequency) and 100.5 MHz. It carries the La Mejor grupera format from MVS Radio and is owned by Aracely del Carmen Escalante Jasso.

The station became an AM/FM combo in 1994, as part of the first wave of AM/FM combo stations in various regions of Mexico.

XHBCC-FM is authorized for HD Radio.

References

Regional Mexican radio stations
Radio stations in Campeche